= Car Catalogue International =

Automotive magazine

Car Catalogue International was an English language version of the Italian car magazine Auto Catalogo Internazionale.

Produced from 1975 to 1996, it was originally published by Edizioni A.I.D S.p.A. of Milan, Italy. The publisher changed to Sonnen Verlag S A of Switzerland in 1981.

The magazine documented an example of each model of car available during that year from most of the major motor manufacturers of the time. Cars were listed in ascending order sorted by marque. Images used were usually press photos from the manufacturers themselves, or their importers. Prices of cars, inclusive of VAT, were stated for most cars. Beneath the price was an address for the manufacturer and/or importer.

Each page listed 2 or 3 cars in colour, with press photos from the manufacturer alongside technical specifications, and the listed price for the car. Content was the same for each language edition, and included vehicles which were not necessarily available in the country the publication was sold. In those instances, the price was listed as "not stated".
